Cyathea biliranensis is a species of fern in the family Cyatheaceae, native to the Philippines. It was first described by Edwin Copeland in 1955.

References

biliranensis
Flora of the Philippines
Plants described in 1955